Gaya is a genus of flowering plants belonging to the family Malvaceae. It has been classed in the Malvoideae subfamily and the Malveae tribe.

It is native to Tropical America with its greatest diversity in Brazil (up to 14 species). It is also found in the countries of Argentina, Bolivia, Colombia, Cuba, Dominican Republic, Ecuador, El Salvador, Guatemala, Guyana, Haiti, Honduras, Leeward Is., Mexico, Nicaragua, Paraguay, Peru, Uruguay and Venezuela.

General description
Shrubs or herbs, with toothed leaves, flowers either yellowish or purplish, mainly solitary in the axils, sometimes racemose, with 8 carpels or more, membranaceous, bi-valvate and one seeded.

Taxonomy
The genus name of Gaya is in honour of Jaques Étienne Gay (1786–1864), a Swiss-French botanist, civil servant, collector and taxonomist.
It was first described and published in (F.W.H.von Humboldt, A.J.A.Bonpland & C.S.Kunth; Editors), Nov. Gen. Sp. Vol.5 on page 266 in 1823.

Known species

According to Kew;

References

External links
  BONPLANDIA 9 (1-2): 57-87. 1996, SINOPSIS DEL GENERO GAYA (MALVACEAE), por A. KRAPOVICKAS (In Spanish, descriptions of many species of Gaya)

Malpighiaceae
Malpighiaceae genera
Plants described in 1823
Flora of South America